The International Convention for the Prevention of Pollution of the Sea by Oil (OILPOL) was an International Treaty signed in London on 12 May 1954 (OILPOL 54). It was updated in 1962 (OILPOL 62), 1969 (OILPOL 69), and 1971 (OILPOL 71).  OILPOL was subsumed by the International Convention for the Prevention of Pollution from Ships (MARPOL) in 1973.

Since 1959, OILPOL is administered and promoted by the International Maritime Organization (IMO), which states:

Great Barrier Reef incident
On 3 March 1970, the Liberian crude oil tanker Oceanic Grandeur struck an uncharted rock in Torres Strait while en route from Dumai, Indonesia, to Brisbane. The incident resulted in a significant spill. Due to concern about the Great Barrier Reef, amendments in OILPOL 71 were provided to extend the restricted zone to the Great Barrier Reef.

References

External links
International Maritime Organization OILPOL 

Treaties of Argentina
Treaties of Australia
Treaties of the Bahamas
Treaties of Chile
Treaties of Fiji
Treaties of Germany
Treaties of Israel
Treaties of Italy
Treaties of Liberia
Treaties of Panama
Treaties of Poland
Treaties of Portugal
Treaties of Saudi Arabia
Treaties of Tunisia
Treaties of the Soviet Union
Treaties of the United Kingdom
Treaties of the United States
1954 in the environment
1962 in the environment
1969 in the environment
1970 in the environment
1971 in the environment